Kern Community College District is a community college district in Kern County, California. Colleges a part of the district are: Bakersfield College, Porterville College, and Cerro Coso Community College.

References

External links

California Community Colleges
Universities and colleges in Kern County, California
Educational institutions established in 1968
1968 establishments in California